Sagran Chal (also Romanized as Sagrān Chāl and Sakrān Chāl) is a village in Miyan Taleqan Rural District, in the Central District of Taleqan County, Alborz Province, Iran. At the 2006 census, its population was 94, in 32 families.

References 

Populated places in Taleqan County